Heidi Alberta Hulan is a Canadian diplomat who has been Ambassador to Austria since 2017.  

Hulan is also serving as Ambassador and Permanent Representative to the International Organizations in Vienna.  Hulan has also served as Minister Counsellor and Head of Political Section at Canada's Permanent Mission to the United Nations in New York and was Deputy Permanent Representative of Canada to NATO from 2010 to 2013.

Hulan has a degree in Philosophy and Political Science from McGill University.

References

Living people
McGill University alumni
Canadian women ambassadors
Ambassadors of Canada to Austria
Year of birth missing (living people)